In the Clearing is a 1962 poetry collection by Robert Frost. It contains the poem "For John F. Kennedy His Inauguration", much of which Frost had composed to be read at President Kennedy's inauguration but could not. The book is also known for "Kitty Hawk", the book's longest poem, which muses on the Wright Brothers' accomplishment in manned flight.

Preparation
Invited to recite "The Gift Outright" at the inauguration of President John F. Kennedy, Frost composed a new, prefatory poem that became "For John F. Kennedy His Inauguration". At the actual event Frost wasn't able to read the latter poem, but still recited the former from memory.

After the Kennedy inauguration, Frost had "high hopes" of finishing the collection of poems he had been promising Holt for the past several years. As of 1954, the title was "The Great Misgiving". It had been Frost's misgivings about the quality of his later poetry that had prevented him from putting it into print much earlier.

Publication
Published by Holt, Rinehart and Winston in New York on his 88th birthday, March 26, 1962, ten months before his death, it was the last volume of his poetry published in his lifetime.

Contents
 "But God's Own Descent"
 "Pod of the Milkweed"
 "Away!"
 "A Cabin in the Clearing"
 "Closed for Good"
 "America Is Hard to See"
 "One More Brevity"
 "Escapist - Never"
 "For John F. Kennedy His Inauguration"

 CLUSTER OF FAITH*
 "Accidentally on Purpose"
 "A Never Naught Song"
 "Version"
 "A Concept Self-Conceived"
 "Forgive, O Lord"

 "Kitty Hawk"
 "Auspex"
 "The Draft Horse"
 "Ends"
 "Peril of Hope"
 "Questioning Faces"
 "Does No One at All
Ever Feel This Way in the Least?"
 "The Bad Island - Easter"
 "Our Doom to Bloom"
 "The Objection to Being Stepped On"
 "A-Wishing Well"
 "How Hard It Is to Keep from Being King
When It's in You and in the Situation"
 "Lines Written in Dejection
on the Eve of Great Success"
 "The Milky Way Is a Cowpath"
 "Some Science Fiction"

QUANDARY
 "Quandary"
 "A Reflex"
 "In a Glass of Cider"
 "From Iron"
 "Four-Room Shack Aspiring High"
 "But Outer Space"
 "On Being Chosen Poet of Vermont"
 "We Vainly Wrestle with the Blind Belief"
 "It Takes All Sorts of In and Outdoor Schooling"
 "In Winter in the Woods Alone"

Footnotes

References
Citations

Works cited

Further reading

1962 poetry books
American poetry collections
Poetry by Robert Frost
Massachusetts culture
Works by Robert Frost